Bagani, (sometimes stylized as  BAGANI), is a 2018 Philippine television drama fantasy series, starring Enrique Gil, Liza Soberano, Matteo Guidicelli, Makisig Morales, and Zaijian Jaranilla. The series originally aired on ABS-CBN's Primetime Bida evening block and worldwide on The Filipino Channel from March 5 to August 17, 2018, replacing La Luna Sangre and was replaced by Ngayon at Kailanman.

Premise
Bagani revolves around the struggle and conflict of five groups: Taga-Patag (farmers), Taga-Kalakal (traders), Taga-Laot (fishermen), Taga-Gubat (hunters) and Taga-Disyerto (warriors) in a fantasy world called Sansinukob.

Cast and characters

Main cast

Supporting cast

Recurring cast

Production

Casting
Bailey May and Ylona Garcia were initially part of the main cast. The two withdrew from the cast due to their conflicting schedules. The respective roles of May and Garcia were given to Sofia Andres and Makisig Morales in final casting. Deither Ocampo returns to ABS-CBN with Bagani after leaving the network in 2014. He worked for The 5 Network and GMA Network during his break from ABS-CBN. Gil and Soberano returned to the said drama series after Forevermore in 2014 and Dolce Amore in 2016.

After 7 years, Kristine returns to ABS-CBN since Noah for her last appearance. She and Diether Ocampo work together in Sana'y Wala Nang Wakas, 'Til Death Do Us Part and Palimos ng Pag-ibig (Sineserye Presents' first installment). Kristine and Rio Locsin also both play the role of Luisa Santos-Medel and Idad Santos in Gulong ng Palad.

Setting
Enrique Gil, one of Bagani's stars, has stated that the series tells a story on how the Philippines was "born" and will be about Filipino culture. Though headwriter Mark Angos, following a casting controversy, later clarified that Bagani is set in a fictional world called Sansinukob which was conceptualized using elements from Philippine mythology.

Filming
The desert scenes were filmed in Paoay, Ilocos Norte. The village sets were designed by Leeroy New and were built in Ilocos. New also made some sets in Bulacan.

Release
In May 2017, Liza Soberano announced the title of the television series to the public. The select members of the Bagani cast wearing their respective character's costumes participated in a trade launch event of ABS-CBN on November 28, 2017. This led to comparisons with Encantadia, a fantasy series by rival network GMA.

A teaser poster of Bagani was released in January 2018, while a full trailer of the series was released online on February 8. The trailer features Lakas, a character played by Enrique Gil as well as the setting and battle scenes of the series.

The series started its run on March 5, 2018, replacing La Luna Sangre.

Reruns
Bagani re-aired on Kapamilya Channel's Kapamilya Gold afternoon block and A2Z from August 29, 2022, to November 25, 2022, replacing the reruns of Init sa Magdamag and was replaced by the reruns of Ang sa Iyo Ay Akin.

Reception

Television ratings

Controversies

Casting decision
In February 2018, prior to its airing, Bagani was criticized online for casting actors of Caucasian descent in a show supposedly inspired by pre-colonial Philippine mythology. The main cast includes: Enrique Gil, who is of Spanish and German descent; Liza Soberano, whose mother is American; and Matteo Guidicelli who is half Italian. Netizens criticized the entertainment industry for setting fair skin as the standard of beauty. They also criticized the use of makeup to make the actors look like they have brown skin.

Liza Soberano responded to the critics through a tweet where she defended her Filipino identity: "My father is full Filipino. I was raised by two Filipinos since the age of 4." The show's headwriter, Mark Angos, explained through Twitter that Bagani is set in Sansinukob, a fictional alternate world with elements from Filipino mythology. He clarified that Bagani is not "precolonial" or "historical". He also explained that the actors who portray the "desert people" had to wear brown makeup because the script states that dirt and sand sticks to their skin. He also added that "colorism is real" but using it as "a bullet to demonize Filipinos of mixed heritage" is "disgusting". Other netizens also defended the show.

Portrayal of the "Bagani"
The series has also been criticized by historical societies and indigenous groups for what they view as a "misuse" of the term "Bagani" and misrepresentation of Philippine tribes. Ronald Adamat of the Commission on Higher Education took umbrage and sought clarification from ABS-CBN over its depiction of indigenous people, stating he was "deeply bothered about the portrayal of ‘Bagani’ in a teleserye as being a ‘bayani with magical powers.’"

On March 5, 2018, the National Commission on Indigenous Peoples (NCIP) released a statement on the use of "Bagani" in the series stating that the "Bagani" are real, not fictional, or a "mythological group of warriors" that the Bagani television series "would like to portray" noting that the term originally refers to the peacekeeping force of the Manobo and other indigenous groups of Mindanao. It insisted that the use of the concept of Bagani in the television series "distorts, misleads and confuses" the meaning of the indigenous term. ABS-CBN released a statement that it does not intend to malign any indigenous group and that Bagani seeks "to feature warriors, protectors, and heroes who espouse Filipino values and beliefs" and pointed out that the series was never purport itself as a historical account of Philippine history or culture.

A disclaimer was since incorporated in the program, stating:

The aforementioned disclaimer was later revised in subsequent episodes starting March 14, stating:

ABS-CBN released a press release statement on March 13, 2018, that it has made a consensus with representatives from the Commission on Higher Education, House of Representatives, and the National Commission on Indigenous Peoples that the indigenous term of "Bagani" was used by network in good faith that it shall remain the title of the series. It also express its willingness to become a "partner" to these groups to promote awareness on indigenous Filipino culture. The writers and directors of Bagani later added in a press conference on March 15 that they found the need to "explore" the concept of the "Bagani" from the indigenous people's point of view and remarked how the television series encouraged "intelligent discussions about culture, identity, etc." in comparison to other teleseryes.

GMA-7 headwriter Suzette Doctolero also criticized the show particularly on the portrayal of Babaylans.

Awards and nominations

See also
Bagani
 List of programs broadcast by ABS-CBN
 List of drama series of ABS-CBN

References

External links
 

ABS-CBN drama series
Fantaserye and telefantasya
2018 Philippine television series debuts
2018 Philippine television series endings
Television series by Star Creatives
Costume drama television series
Philippine mythology
Filipino-language television shows
Television shows set in the Philippines